RMAS Magnet (A114) was the eponymous Magnet class Royal Navy degaussing ship.  She was completed in 1979 by Cleland.

Class
As well as the Magnet, a sister ship, RMAS Lodestone (A115) was built by Cleland in 1980.

The Magnet class was developed to replace the Ham-class minesweepers that had been converted for degaussing.  They are 828 tons gross register tonnage (GRT) and have a top speed of 14 knots.  They measure 55m x 12m x 4m.

References

Magnet class degaussing ships of the Royal Navy
1979 ships